Acronicta thoracica is a moth of the family Noctuidae. It is found in western North America.

The wingspan is about 38 mm.

References

External links
Images

thoracica
Moths of North America
Moths described in 1880